Ana María Rojas Ruiz (born 20 January 1969) is a Mexican politician from the Institutional Revolutionary Party. From 2009 to 2012 she served as Deputy of the LXI Legislature of the Mexican Congress representing Chiapas.

References

1969 births
Living people
Politicians from Chiapas
Women members of the Chamber of Deputies (Mexico)
Institutional Revolutionary Party politicians
21st-century Mexican politicians
21st-century Mexican women politicians
Deputies of the LXI Legislature of Mexico
Members of the Chamber of Deputies (Mexico) for Chiapas